The Soviet Union submitted films for the American Academy Award for Best International Feature Film between 1963 and 1991. The Foreign Language Film award is handed out annually by the U.S.-based Academy of Motion Picture Arts and Sciences to a feature-length motion picture produced outside the United States that contains primarily non-English dialogue.

Each year, the Academy invites countries to submit their best films for competition, with only one film being accepted from each country. The Soviet Union had a strong record in the category, receiving a total of nine nominations between 1968–1984, including three winners – War and Peace, Dersu Uzala and Moscow Does Not Believe in Tears. Eight of the nominees, including all three winners, were produced by Russian film studios. After the breakup of the Soviet Union, films representing the Russian Federation won a further seven nominations, including one Oscar win for Burnt by the Sun.

Submissions
The Academy of Motion Picture Arts and Sciences has invited the film industries of various countries to submit their best film for the Academy Award for Best Foreign Language Film since 1956. The Foreign Language Film Award Committee oversees the process and reviews all the submitted films. Following this, they vote via secret ballot to determine the five nominees for the award. Below is a list of the films that have been submitted by the Soviet Union for review by the Academy since 1963. All Soviet submissions were filmed in Russian except for 1987's Georgian language Repentance.

Among the submissions were two films that sat on the shelf for several years awaiting approval from Soviet censors (1987–1988), a Japanese co-production (1975) and a documentary (1981). During the Soviet era, it was routine for productions to have cast and crew from throughout the country. However, each republic had its own film studios, and the "Republic of Production" indicates the republic of the film studio that produced the film. However, even outside of the Russian SFSR films were still produced in Russian, except for 1987 when the Soviet Union was nearing its collapse.

See also
Moscow Strikes Back, 1942 Soviet documentary film, one of four winners at the 15th Academy Awards for Best Documentary
List of Russian submissions for the Academy Award for Best Foreign Language Film
List of Armenian submissions for the Academy Award for Best International Feature Film
List of Azerbaijani submissions for the Academy Award for Best International Feature Film
List of Belarusian submissions for the Academy Award for Best International Feature Film
List of Estonian submissions for the Academy Award for Best International Feature Film
List of Georgian submissions for the Academy Award for Best International Feature Film
List of Kazakhstani submissions for the Academy Award for Best International Feature Film
List of Kyrgyz submissions for the Academy Award for Best International Feature Film
List of Latvian submissions for the Academy Award for Best International Feature Film
List of Lithuanian submissions for the Academy Award for Best International Feature Film
List of Moldovan submissions for the Academy Award for Best International Feature Film
List of Tajik submissions for the Academy Award for Best International Feature Film
List of Ukrainian submissions for the Academy Award for Best International Feature Film
List of Uzbekistani submissions for the Academy Award for Best International Feature Film
Cinema of the Soviet Union
List of Academy Award winners and nominees for Best Foreign Language Film

Notes

References

Soviet Union
Academy Award
Academy Award
Soviet Union–United States relations